Adverse is a 2020 American crime thriller film written and directed by Brian Metcalf and starring Thomas Nicholas, Lou Diamond Phillips, Sean Astin, Kelly Arjen, Penelope Ann Miller, and Mickey Rourke. It premiered at the Fantasporto Film Festival, Portugal's largest film festival, on February 28, 2020. The film earned Metcalf a Platinum Remi Award at the WorldFest-Houston International Film Festival.

The film was released theatrically in the United States on February 12, 2021, by Lionsgate.

The film received a 75% rating at Rotten Tomatoes.

Premise
A rideshare driver discovers that his sister is in debt to a dangerous crime syndicate.

Cast
 Thomas Nicholas as Ethan
 Lou Diamond Phillips as Dr. Cruz
 Sean Astin as Frankie
 Kelly Arjen as Mia
 Penelope Ann Miller as Nicole
 Mickey Rourke as Kaden
 Jake T. Austin as Lars
 Matt Ryan as Jake
 Andrew Keegan as Jan
 Aaron Schwartz as Detective Mitchell
 Charlene Amoia as Mary
 Jesse Garcia as Detective Ranie
 Brian Metcalf as Dante

Production
Principal photography began in Los Angeles in October 2018. On January 17, 2019, it was confirmed that filming had been completed.

Release
Adverse had its world premiere at FantasPorto 2020, a film festival held in Oporto, Portugal, in February 2020. The film was theatrically released in the United States on February 12, 2021, by Lionsgate.

Critical reception

Variety's Joe Leydon reviewed the film stating "Writer-director Brian A. Metcalf’s indie offering boasts some impressive rough stuff and a surprisingly affecting turn by Mickey Rourke."

The film was praised by critics, carrying a 75% rating at Rotten Tomatoes.

References

External links
 

2020 films
2020 crime thriller films
2020 thriller drama films
2020 crime drama films
American crime drama films
American crime thriller films
American neo-noir films
American thriller drama films
Films shot in Los Angeles
2020s English-language films
2020s American films